Roman Dorosh (born 1 January 1987 in Kyiv, Ukrainian SSR) is a Ukrainian football midfielder who plays for FC Ternopil.

Career
Dorosh is a product of the Dynamo Kyiv youth sportive school and spent time playing for different Ukrainian teams. In July 2013 he signed a contract with FC Olimpik Donetsk.

References

External links
Profile at Official Site FFU (Ukr)

Ukrainian footballers
Association football midfielders
1987 births
Living people
Footballers from Kyiv
FC Nafkom Brovary players
FC Bukovyna Chernivtsi players
FC Olimpik Donetsk players